21 Motorised Infantry Brigade (pronounced as Two One Motorised Infantry Brigade) is a brigade of the Namibian Army based at Suiderhof, Windhoek. The prefix "21" is taken from 21 March 1990, Namibia's independence day. The brigade is responsible for the defence of the central areas of Namibia. Its subordinate units are situated in the Khomas. Apart from its Motorised battalions it also consists of a Mechanized Infantry Battalion. It also provides a ceremonial guard battalion for the Head of State.

Equipment
The Brigade uses the following equipment:
Toyota Land Cruiser
Toyota Hilux
Ural Trucks
WZ-523 Wheeled Armored Personnel Carrier

Units

The standard Namibian Infantry Brigade consists of a brigade Headquarters, a transport company, logistics company and a medical company supporting three Infantry battalions an artillery regiment and an air defence regiment. It also has a ceremonial guard battalion attached to it.

The following units are based at the brigade headquarters in Windhoek:
21 Ceremonial Guard Battalion
211 Battalion
212 Battalion
213 Mechanized Infantry Battalion
21 Artillery Regiment (Otjiwarongo)

21 Ceremonial Guard Battalion

21 Ceremonial Guard Battalion is a guard of honour unit of the NDF. It was also responsible for protecting the President of Namibia till President Hifikepunye Pohamba stopped the practice. It has 500 members and is based in the capital where it performs public duties. It uses Russian/German foot drill when marching, in part due to the country returning to the traditional goose step. International leaders that have been honored by the battalion include Russian President Dmitry Medvedev, Kenya President Uhuru Kenyatta and the Chair of the African Union Commission Moussa Faki.

Leadership

References

Military of Namibia
Infantry brigades